Temnoscheila is a genus of bark-gnawing beetles in the family Trogossitidae, historically often misspelled as "Temnochila". There are about 19 described species in Temnoscheila.

Species
These 19 species belong to the genus Temnoscheila:

 Temnoscheila acuta b
 Temnoscheila aerea b
 Temnoscheila barbata b
 Temnoscheila coerulea (Olivier, 1790) g
 Temnoscheila chevrolati Reitter, 1875 g
 Temnoscheila chlorodia (Mannerheim, 1843) g b (green bark beetle)
 Temnoscheila chrysostema Reitter, 1875 g
 Temnoscheila colossus (Audinet-Serville, 1828) g
 Temnoscheila curta Léveillé, 1889 g
 Temnoscheila doumerei Audinet-Serville, 1828 g
 Temnoscheila edentata b
 Temnoscheila foveicollis Reitter, 1875 g
 Temnoscheila hubbardi b
 Temnoscheila laevicollis Reitter, 1875 g
 Temnoscheila obscura (Reitter, 1875) g
 Temnoscheila omolopha b
 Temnoscheila splendida Gory, 1831 g
 Temnoscheila varians Guerini, 1846 g
 Temnoscheila virescens (Fabricius, 1775) b

Data sources: i = ITIS, c = Catalogue of Life, g = GBIF, b = Bugguide.net

References

Further reading

External links

 

Trogossitidae